Le Havre AC Handball is a French women's handball club from Le Havre representing Le Havre AC in the French Division 2.

Le Havre has won two national cups in 2006 and 2007, and it has been the championship's runner-up between 2006 and 2010. Its best result in international competitions so far was reaching the 2010 EHF Cup's semifinals.

Titles
 French Cup
 2006, 2007

Team

Current squad
Squad for the 2020-21 season.

Goalkeepers
 12  Victoria Alric
 21  Marina Pantić
Wingers
RW
 19  Elisa Perrault
 25  Aminata Doucouré
LW
 11  Adja Sanou Paye
 20  Mathita Diawara
Line players
 23  Maiwenn Dasylva
 79  Sharon Dorson

Back players
LB
 13  Margot Kiers
 24  Claire Mussard
 27  Louison Boisorieux
 89  Tatiana Elisme
CB
 26  Irene Fanton
 29  Jane Le Nozach
RB
 15  Yaëlle Morvan
 96  Oumayma Dardour

References

Le Havre AC
Sport in Le Havre
French handball clubs